William Newcomb (1927 – 29 May 1999) was an American theoretical physicist and professor at the University of California's Lawrence Livermore Laboratory, who is best known as the creator of Newcomb's paradox, devised in 1960. He was the great-grandnephew of the astronomer Simon Newcomb.

Newcomb started at the Lawrence Livermore National Laboratory (then University of California Radiation Laboratory) probably in 1955 in the Energy Directorate.  He was also an adjunct professor in the UC Davis Livermore Department of Applied Science since 1971.

References

1927 births
1999 deaths
Lawrence Livermore National Laboratory staff
University of California, Berkeley faculty
University of California, Davis faculty